Eatonville is a town in Pierce County, Washington, United States. The population was 2,845 at the 2020 census. The town motto is "Better Together".

History
For centuries, Nisqually people roamed the rivers and streams of the Eatonville area. Leschi, one of the main leaders of Nisqually was born in this area in 1808.

In 1889, Indian Henry was one of the Nisqually who guided the town's Euro-American founder, Thomas C. Van Eaton, from Mashell Prairie to the present site of Eatonville. Legend has it that upon arrival Henry declared, "This is a good place. Not much snow."

Area white settlers and the accompanying Nisqually were in need of goods, which "T.C." provided at his trading post. Supplies were carried by his stage from Spanaway over a rough trail through dense forest. In 1891, the settlers built the town's first school, which is still in use.

For years Eatonville was a waypoint for visitors to Mount Rainier. In 1902, the Tacoma Eastern Railroad arrived, providing freight and passenger service and a vital link to Tacoma. Soon after the railroad's arrival, several small mills sprang up in the vicinity. In the 1970s, the Wildlife park of Northwest Trek was opened and it remains to be one of the most popular tourist attractions in the area, other than Mount Rainier itself.

Eatonville was officially incorporated on October 28, 1909, after the Eatonville Lumber Company brought in more people to work in its mill. The mill closed in 1954.

On April 27, 2014, an EF0 tornado briefly touched down and caused some minor damage near Eatonville.

Geography

Climate
This region experiences warm (but not hot) and dry summers, with no average monthly temperatures above 71.6 F (22 C).  According to the Köppen Climate Classification system, Eatonville has a warm-summer Mediterranean climate, abbreviated "Csb" on climate maps.

Demographics

2010 census

As of the census of 2010, there were 2,758 people, 992 households, and 714 families living in the town. The racial makeup of the town was 90.1% White, 0.5% African American, 1.1% Native American, 0.9% Asian, 0.1% Pacific Islander, 2.9% from other races, and 4.4% from two or more races. Hispanic or Latino of any race were 5.9% of the population.

There were 992 households, of which 41.4% had children under the age of 18 living with them, 54.9% were married couples living together, 10.8% had a female householder with no husband present, 6.3% had a male householder with no wife present, and 28.0% were non-families. 23.1% of all households were made up of individuals, and 11.7% had someone living alone who was 65 years of age or older. The average household size was 2.78 and the average family size was 3.26.

The median age in the town was 34.4 years. 30.4% of residents were under the age of 18; 7.6% were between the ages of 18 and 24; 25.9% were from 25 to 44; 23.5% were from 45 to 64; and 12.6% were 65 years of age or older. The gender makeup of the town was 48.1% male and 51.9% female.

2000 census
As of the census of 2000, there were 2,012 people, 748 households, and 542 families living in the town. The population density was 1,176.4 people per square mile (454.3/km2). There were 805 housing units at an average density of 470.7 per square mile (181.8/km2). The racial makeup of the town was 91.35% White, 0.25% African American, 0.75% Native American, 0.80% Asian, 0.65% Pacific Islander, 2.24% from other races, and 3.98% from two or more races. Hispanic or Latino of any race were 4.62% of the population.

There were 748 households, out of which 38.9% had children under the age of 18 living with them, 56.8% were married couples living together, 11.8% had a female householder with no husband present, and 27.5% were non-families. 22.7% of all households were made up of individuals, and 11.2% had someone living alone who was 65 years of age or older. The average household size was 2.69 and the average family size was 3.16.

In the town, the population was spread out, with 31.4% under the age of 18, 8.0% from 18 to 24, 27.8% from 25 to 44, 20.5% from 45 to 64, and 12.4% who were 65 years of age or older. The median age was 34 years. For every 100 females, there were 94.2 males. For every 100 females age 18 and over, there were 89.0 males.

The median income for a household in the town was $43,681, and the median income for a family was $50,733. Males had a median income of $41,950 versus $25,380 for females. The per capita income for the town was $19,513. About 11.0% of families and 11.8% of the population were below the poverty line, including 11.6% of those under age 18 and 9.8% of those age 65 or over.

Notable people
Mark Fuhrman, former Los Angeles Police Detective, and key figure in the murder trial of O.J. Simpson.

References

External links
 Official site of the Town of Eatonville
 

Towns in Pierce County, Washington
Towns in Washington (state)
1909 establishments in Washington (state)